Blackout is a 2021 Nigerian film written and directed by a Malaysian based Nigerian actor Abbey Abimbola (Crackydon). The movie was released in October 2021 and was produced by the actors that featured in the movie includes Segun Arinze, Abbey Abimbola, Akin Olaiya, Toyin Alausa. The movie is all about the crisis and problem faced by average Nigerians concerning power supply.

The film was premiered at the cinemas around Nigeria on 29 October 2021

Plot 
The film started with an outspoken businesswoman and activist named Adam Shan who spearheaded a new protest movement that quickly gained support from the people across the country; painfully she is then brutally killed. When her son receives the shocking news, her son Captain Abdalla (Crackydon) resigned from the Nigerian Army to seek justice for the death of his mother.

The film Blackout stirs up a lot of controversy around the poor condition of power supply in Africa and Nigeria. For many years, the majority of Nigerians who depend on NEPA "PHCN" for their daily electricity have experienced disruptions in their daily lives.

Cast 

 Segun Arinze
 Abbey Abimbola 
 Toyin Alausa
 Abbey Abimbola 
 Akin Olaiya 
 Eniola Ajao
 Murphy Afolabi 
 Tayo Sobola

See also
 List of Nigerian films of 2021

References

External links 
 

2021 films
Nigerian drama films
English-language Nigerian films